Mamadou Tounkara (born 14 December 2001) is a French professional footballer who plays as a centre-back for the club Vitória Guimarães in the Primeira Liga.

Club career
A youth product of Drancy, Tounkara began his senior career with them in 2019. On 16 June 2020, he transferred to Vitória Guimarães where he signed a 3-year contract. He spent his first 2 seasons with their reserves. He made his professional debut with Vitória Guimarães as a half-time substitute in a 1–0 Primeira Liga loss to Braga on 3 September 2022. On 10 September 2022, he was promoted to their senior side and renewed his contract until 2025.

Personal life
Born in France, Tounkara is of Malian descent.

References

External links
 

2001 births
Living people
Sportspeople from Épinay-sur-Seine
French footballers
French sportspeople of Malian descent
JA Drancy players
Vitória S.C. players
Vitória S.C. B players
Championnat National 2 players
Primeira Liga players
Campeonato de Portugal (league) players
Association football defenders